William Thomas Hutton (born July 8, 1972 in Memphis, Tennessee) is a former professional American football player who played punter.  As an undrafted free agent, Hutton played for four seasons for the Philadelphia Eagles of the National Football League where he averaged 42.4 yards on 349 punts, and had 77 of his kicks downed inside the 20-yard line. Hutton played for the Miami Dolphins in 1999 and was with the Green Bay Packers during the 2000 training camp. In his elementary years, he attended Presbyterian Day School and Woodland Presbyterian School. He proceeded to Memphis University School for high school, where he graduated in 1991. He then walked on and played college football at the University of Tennesse where he was the starting punter for four years.  He currently resides in Memphis with his wife, whom he married in 1998, and two daughters.

References

1972 births
Living people
Players of American football from Memphis, Tennessee
American football punters
Tennessee Volunteers football players
Philadelphia Eagles players
Miami Dolphins players